Kafraj or Kefraj may refer to:

Kafraj, Hamadan
Kafraj, Lorestan